The United Nations Educational, Scientific and Cultural Organization (UNESCO) World Heritage Sites are places of importance to cultural or natural heritage as described in the UNESCO World Heritage Convention, established in 1972. Jordan accepted the convention on 5 May 1975, making its historical sites eligible for inclusion on the list. As of 2021, Six sites in Jordan are included.

World Heritage Sites 

Site; named after the World Heritage Committee's official designation
Location; at city, regional, or provincial level and geocoordinates
Criteria; as defined by the World Heritage Committee
Area; in hectares and acres. If available, the size of the buffer zone has been noted as well. The lack of value implies that no data has been published by UNESCO
Year; during which the site was inscribed to the World Heritage List
Description; brief information about the site, including reasons for qualifying as an endangered site, if applicable

Tentative list
In addition to sites inscribed on the World Heritage List, member states can maintain a list of tentative sites that they may consider for nomination. Nominations for the World Heritage List are only accepted if the site was previously listed on the tentative list. As of 2021, Jordan lists fourteen properties on its tentative list:

See also

Tourism in Jordan
List of World Heritage Sites in Western Asia
List of World Heritage Sites in the Arab states

References

World Heritage Sites in Jordan
Jordan
World Heritage Sites